From March 1987 to March 1, 1994, Nirvana performed a variety of shows and concerts.

List of live performances

Early gigs

Bleach club tour

Late-1990 to mid-1991 intermittent club shows

Nevermind club, arena and festival tour

Mid-1992 to early-1993 arena, festival and stadium shows

Mid-1993 intermittent arena shows

In Utero arena tour

Notes:

References

External links 

 Nirvana Live Guide
 Live Nirvana

Concerts
Lists of concert tours
Nirvana